Simakan District is a district (bakhsh) in Jahrom County, Fars Province, Iran. At the 2006 census, its population was 16,973, in 3,781 families.  The District has one city: Duzeh. The District has three rural districts (dehestan): Pol Beh Bala Rural District , Pol Beh Pain Rural District, and Posht Par Rural District.

References 

Jahrom County
Districts of Fars Province